Gennaro Giametta (Frattamaggiore, August 4, 1867 - February 8, 1938) was an Italian painter. He worked under Pasquale Pontecorvo and Arnaldo De Lisio. He eventually moved to Buenos Aires in Argentina to work for many years. He then returned to Italy and entered politics.

References

1867 births
1938 deaths
19th-century Italian painters
19th-century Italian male artists
Italian male painters
20th-century Italian painters
20th-century Italian male artists
Painters from Naples
Argentine painters
Argentine male painters